Guillaume Ulens (11 July 1909 – 10 November 1970) was a Belgian footballer. He played in one match for the Belgium national football team in 1935.

References

External links
 

1909 births
1970 deaths
Belgian footballers
Belgium international footballers
Place of birth missing
Association football forwards